NAK is the negative-acknowledge character used in computers and telecommunications.

NAK or Nak may also refer to:

 A female yak, in the Tibetan language
 Nak, Hungary, a village in Tolna County, Hungary
 NaK, an alloy of sodium and potassium metals
 Mae Nak Phra Khanong, a ghost of Thai folklore
 Nak (film), an animated film based on the Thai ghost
 Ningalkkum Aakaam Kodeeshwaran, a quiz show in Malayalam based on Who Wants To Be A Millionaire?
 NAK, the IATA airport code for Nakhon Ratchasima Airport

See also

 
 Knack (disambiguation)
 KNAK (disambiguation), including callsign K-NAK
 Nack (disambiguation)
 NAC (disambiguation)
 Naq (disambiguation)
 WNAK (disambiguation), including callsign W-NAK